Rupert C. Thompson Arena is a 3,500-seat hockey arena in Hanover, New Hampshire. It is home to the Dartmouth College Big Green men's and women's ice hockey teams.  The barrel-vaulted, reinforced concrete arena was designed by renowned architect Pier Luigi Nervi. It was named for Rupert C. Thompson '28, the major benefactor of the project, and replaced Davis Rink, the original "indoor" home of Dartmouth hockey from 1929 to 1975.  (Davis Rink, which was located next to old Alumni Gym, was demolished in 1985 to make way for the Berry Sports Center.)

External links
 Thompson Arena at the Dartmouth athletic website
 Dartmouth Hockey celebrates 100th year

College ice hockey venues in the United States
Indoor ice hockey venues in the United States
Dartmouth College facilities
Sports venues in New Hampshire
Indoor arenas in New Hampshire
Concrete shell structures
Buildings and structures in Grafton County, New Hampshire
Sports venues completed in 1975
1975 establishments in New Hampshire
Pier Luigi Nervi buildings
Modernist architecture in New Hampshire